The 2022–23 Associate international cricket season is from September 2022 to April 2023. All official twenty over matches between Associate members of the ICC are eligible to have full Twenty20 International (T20I) or Women's Twenty20 International (WT20I) status, as the International Cricket Council (ICC) granted T20I status to matches between all of its members from 1 July 2018 (women's teams) and 1 January 2019 (men's teams). The season includes all T20I/WT20I cricket series mostly involving ICC Associate members, that are played in addition to series covered in International cricket in 2022–23. The 2023 ACC Men's Challenger Cup and the 2023 ACC Men's Premier Cup, which formed the qualification pathway for the 2023 Asia Cup, were also played during this period.

Season overview

September

2022–23 ICC T20 World Cup EAP Qualifier A

2022 United Arab Emirates Women's Quadrangular Series

2022 ACA Africa T20 Cup

2022 ICC Women's T20 World Cup Qualifier

October

2022 Women's T20I Pacific Cup

Indonesia in Japan

2022 Women's South American Cricket Championship

2022–23 ICC T20 World Cup EAP Qualifier B

2022 Men's South American Cricket Championship

Hong Kong women in Japan

Rwanda in Tanzania

November

Singapore women in Indonesia

2022–23 Spain Tri-Nation Series

2022 Spain Women's Pentangular Series

2022 Desert Cup T20I Series

2022–23 ICC T20 World Cup Africa Qualifier A

December

2022–23 ICC T20 World Cup Africa Qualifier B

2022 East Africa T20 Series

2022–23 Kenya Women's Quadrangular Series

2022–23 Malaysia Quadrangular Series

Philippines women in Cambodia

February

Singapore women in Cambodia

Bermuda in Argentina

2023 ACC Men's Challenger Cup

Isle of Man in Spain

2023 ICC T20 World Cup Americas Sub-Regional Qualifier

March

2022–23 Hong Kong Quadrangular Series

2023 Pacific Island Cricket Challenge (Men)

2023 Pacific Island Cricket Challenge (Women)

2023 Nigeria Invitational Women's T20I Tournament

April

Gibraltar in Portugal
{| class="wikitable"
! colspan="6"|T20I series
|-
! No.
! Date
! Home captain
! Away captain
! Venue
! Result
|-
| [ 1st T20I] || 10 April ||  || Balaji Pai || Gucherre Cricket Ground, Albergaria || 
|-
| [ 2nd T20I] || 10/11 April ||  || Balaji Pai || Gucherre Cricket Ground, Albergaria || 
|-
| [ 3rd T20I] || 11 April ||  || Balaji Pai || Gucherre Cricket Ground, Albergaria || 
|}

2023 Men's Premier Cup

See also
 International cricket in 2022–23

Notes

References

2022 in cricket
2023 in cricket